The Central District of Kuhdasht County is a district (bakhsh) in Kuhdasht County, Lorestan Province, Iran. At the 2006 census, its population was 121,775, in 25,364 families.  The District has one city: Kuhdasht. The District contains three Rural Districts: Gol Gol Rural District, Kuhdasht-e Jonubi Rural District, and Kuhdasht-e Shomali Rural District.

References 

Districts of Lorestan Province
Kuhdasht County